The 2023 Big South women's basketball tournament is the postseason women's basketball tournament that will end the 2022–23 NCAA Division I women's basketball season of the Big South Conference. It will be held from March 1 through March 5 and played at Bojangles Coliseum.  The tournament winner will receive the automatic bid to the 2023 NCAA tournament.

Seeds
All of the conference teams will compete in the tournament. The top six team will receive a first-round bye. Teams are seeded by record within the conference, with a tiebreaker system to seed teams with identical conference records.

The tiebreakers operate in the following order:
 Head-to-head record.
 Record against the top-ranked conference team not involved in the tie, going down the standings until the tie is broken. For this purpose, teams with the same conference record are considered collectively. If two teams were unbeaten or winless against an opponent but did not play the same number of games against that opponent, the tie is not considered broken.

Schedule

Bracket 

Note: * denotes overtime

References

External links
Big South WoMen's Basketball Championship

Big South Conference women's basketball tournament
Big South Conference men's basketball tournament